Réka Szőcs (born 19 November 1989 in Cluj-Napoca, Romania) is a Hungarian football goalkeeper currently playing in the Hungarian First Division for MTK Hungária, with whom she has also played the Champions League. She is a member of the Hungarian national team.

References

External links
 

1989 births
Living people
Hungarian women's footballers
Újpesti TE (women) players
MTK Hungária FC (women) players
Sportspeople from Cluj-Napoca
Women's association football goalkeepers
Hungary women's international footballers